Zombina and the Skeletones are an English rock band from Liverpool, formed in 1998 around the nucleus of vocalist Zombina and songwriter Doc Horror. , their last recording was a self-released EP in 2017, and their official website is dismantled.

Their musical style is pop-oriented, with elements of garage punk, doo-wop and hard rock. Due to their apparent obsession with B-movies and black humour, their fanbase extends to the gothic rock, deathrock and psychobilly scenes. The majority of their lyrical content deals with themes of horror and science fiction.

History

Formation 
Zombina met Doc Horror at Calderstones School in 1998. They started a band called The Deformed, producing a demo tape "No Sleep 'Til Transylvania", in early 1999. This tape featured songs that would later be featured on Zombina and the Skeletones albums: "The Grave... And Beyond!", "Braindead" and "Leave My Brain Alone". Since the early years of their formation, the band established a strong B-Movie informed horror theme recalling the early efforts of Misfits and The Cramps.

Career 

In 2005, Zombina and the Skeletones were a featured unsigned band on Mark Radcliffe's show on BBC Radio 2. They have also toured the UK with bands such as The Damned, Misfits and The Meteors.

2006 saw the band headlining Lumous Gothic Festival, Finland. Then in 2007, they played at the Wave-Gotik-Treffen, the very large goth/alternative festival in Leipzig, Germany. They have also played the British Whitby Gothic Weekend four times, first in 2004 and most recently in 2013.

Zombina and the Skeletones have been featured in the UK magazine, Bizarre, and played live at the 2008 "Bizarre Ball" in London. They were scheduled to appear at "Abertoir, the Welsh Horror Festival", and performed as part of the festival.

The band was largely in hiatus during 2012, performing only one show (supporting the Primitives). A new EP, That Doll Just Tried to Kill Me, was released at Halloween 2012, with a Halloween show on 3 November 2012 in Liverpool, anticipating an album release in early 2013.

The whole line-up of Zombina and the Skeletones guest-starred in Cuban American singer Voltaire's 2014 album Raised by Bats, providing additional vocals for the track "Oh, My Goth!".

Reviews 
The band has received positive reviews from the UK music scene website Drowned in Sound. Their 2005 "Counting on your Suicide" was selected by goth/punk journalist Mick Mercer as one of his "Thirty best goth records of all time".

Members 
 Zombina Venus Hatchett - Vocals/Theremin (1999–2017)
 Doc Horror - Guitar/Bass/Vocals (1999–2017)
 Ben Digo - Drums (2006–2017) (ex-The Dangerfields and Bus Station Loonies)
 Kal K'Thulu - Bass (2008–2017)
 X-Ray Speck - Saxophone (2008–2017)
 Velma aka Die Booth - backing vocals 
 Tiddles - backing vocals/cello (1999–2002)
 Grim Outlook - guitar (1999–2004)
 Taylor Woah - guitar (2004)
 Ratt-Lynn Bones aka Kit Shivers - drums/guitar (1999–2005)
 Louie Diablo - guitar/vocals/handclaps (2004–2006)
 Pete Martin - drums (2006)
 Jonny Tokyo - keyboard/bass/vocals (1999–2008) 
 Jettison Dervish - bass (2005 – 17 May 2008)

Discography

Albums 
 Taste the Blood of Zombina and the Skeletones (2002)
 Death Valley High (2006)
 Monsters On 45 (2006) reissued 2009 with extra track
 Out of the Crypt and Into Your Heart (2008)
 Charnel House Rock (2014)

Compilations
 The Eerie Years (comprises the Love Bites and Silver Bullet EPs)
 Get Thee Behind Me Santa (Puppy Dog Records 2002) - includes 'Transylvanian Xmas'
 Too Much Horror Business A Tribute to The Misfits - includes 'Misfits Medley'

EPs
 Loves Bites (2000)
 Halloween Hollerin'! (2003) (now available as a download EP with an extra track)
 7 Song Promo EP (2004)
 3 Songs vs. Your Brain (2006)
 A Chainsaw For Christmas (download EP) (2006)
 Halloween Party Classics (download EP) (2007)
 That Doll Just Tried To Kill Me (2012)
 In Sinistereo (Part One) (2015)
 In Sinistereo (Part Two) (2015)
 In Sinistereo (Part Three) (2016)
 In Sinistereo (Part Four) (2017)

7" EP Trilogy
 I Was A Human Bomb For The F.B.I. (2004)
 Mondo Zombina! (2005)
 Staci Stasis (2005)

Singles
 "Silver Bullet" (2001)
 "Frankenlady" (2002)
 "Nobody Likes You When You're Dead" b/w "Deflesh Mode" (remix) (2002)
 "Dracula Blood" b/w "Deep Vein Thrombosis" (remix) download single (2007)
 "Teenage Caveman Beat Gargantua" / "Futurelife" (2011)

Bootlegs
 Dial Z for Zombina (recorded live at Club Useless 14 September 2004)

References

External links
 Official Zombina and the Skeletones site 
 Zombina and the Skeletones Vampirefreaks page 

Musical groups from Liverpool
English punk rock groups
English gothic rock groups
Horror punk groups
Underground punk scene in the United Kingdom
Death rock groups
Musical groups established in 1998
1998 establishments in England